Krasnoyarsk is a city in Russia.

Krasnoyarsk may also refer to:
Krasnoyarsk Krai, a federal subject of Russia
Krasnoyarsk Urban Okrug, a municipal formation which the krai city of Krasnoyarsk in Krasnoyarsk Krai, Russia is incorporated as
Krasnoyarsk (inhabited locality), several inhabited localities in Russia
Krasnoyarsk Dam, a dam on the Yenisei River, Russia
Krasnoyarsk Reservoir, an artificial lake created by the construction of the Krasnoyarsk Dam
Russian submarine Krasnoyarsk (K-173), Russian Oscar-class submarine
38046 Krasnoyarsk, an outer main-belt asteroid
Krasnojarsk (meteorite), the first pallasite meteorite ever found